Khaitan & Co is one of India's oldest, full-service law firms comprising over 750 fee earners and consultants, including 170 partners and directors. The law firm was founded in 1911 by Debi Prasad Khaitan, a member of the Constituent Assembly of India and one of the 7 members of the Drafting Committee, which framed the Constitution of India. Khaitan & Co has offices in 5 cities in India: Kolkata (founded in 1911), New Delhi (started operations in 1970), Bengaluru (1994), Mumbai (2001) and Chennai (2021). It also has an office in Singapore (2021).

History
Khaitan & Co was founded in 1911 by Late Debi Prasad Khaitan.

At present, Khaitan & Co is headed by an Executive Committee elected by its partners.

Practice areas
The key practice areas are Banking & Finance, Capital markets, Competition Law, Corporate/M&A, Dispute Resolution, Energy, Hospitality, Infrastructure & Resources, Environment, Intellectual Property, Funds, Labour & Employment, Private Client and Trusts, Private Equity, Real Estate, Taxation, Technology, Media & Telecom, White Collar Crime.

Clients
The firm has advised clients like Harley-Davidson India, L N Bangur Group, IGATE, Nippon Life, The Blackstone Group, Vedanta Resources, Hospira, LiquidHub RPG Group.

References

Law firms of India
Law firms established in 1911
Legal organisations based in India